A monotonic scale is a musical scale consisting of only one note in the octave. Having a deliberate fixed note, the monotonic is still a musical form rather than a total absence of melody. The monotonic stands in contrast to more common musical scales, such as the pentatonic (five notes) and modern, common Western heptatonic and chromatic scales.

Liturgical usage
Early Christian liturgical recitation may have been monotonic. Charles William Pearce speculated that the monotonic psalm tone might have been an intermediary step between spoken recitation of the Psalter and melodic singing:

The Annotated Book of Common Prayer similarly notes that (according to Saint Augustine) Saint Athanasius discouraged variance in note in liturgical recitation, but that eventual modulation of the note led to the development of plainsong.

In Māori Christian services in Auckland, New Zealand, the Ten Commandments and the Psalms are sung in a responsorial style called waiata (the Māori word for song), with monotonic chanting alternating between the minister and the congregation. Some of the congregation may sing at the interval of a third above the others, and sometimes a few of the women will add a fourth below, producing a constant second-inversion triad. The end of each phrase is marked by a descending glissando.

Art music
Monotonic passages are also used in art music for stylistic effect. In Schubert's Death and the Maiden, the character of Death generally employs monotonic recitation, described by one scholar as depicting "an inanimate being incapable of the lyricism of the living." In La gazza ladra (1817), Rossini represents Ninetta's simplicity and innocence with an almost monotone declamation at "A mio nome deh consegna questo anello", whereas in the Wolf's Glen scene of Der Freischütz (1821), Weber characterizes the powers of evil by having the invisible spirits sing in monotone, and denies song entirely to Samiel and, finally, also to Max as he succumbs to Samiel's power. Another use of the monotonic scale occurs throughout the first piece of György Ligeti's Musica ricercata, which employs the note A played in a variety of different techniques.

See also
Drone music

References

This article quotes content from The Musical Quarterly, Volume 6 (1920) edited Oscar George Theodore Sonneck, a work in the public domain.

Musical scales
Anhemitonic scales